"No Switch" is a song by American rapper YoungBoy Never Broke Again, released on January 21, 2022, as the third track from his seventeenth mixtape, Colors. In the song, YoungBoy utilizes his raspy voice with a murderous, aggressive cadence as he raps about murder and firearms.

Composition
In "No Switch," YoungBoy raps about murder, firearms, ammunition, and firearm attachments such as a switch. Rapping about his dead friends, YoungBoy leaves subliminal disses towards Lil Durk and King Von, similarly to what he does on Bring the Hook and Fish Scale.

Critical reception
Pitchforks Paul A. Thompson opened his review by noting that the mixtape "opens with a predictably furious suite" and ends his review stating that the song "culminates with closing ad-libs." Anthony Malone from HipHopDX writes that on the song, YoungBoy "continues to bait his opps" and that the track is "nearly foaming at the mouth like a rabid dog for a showdown."

Personnel
Credits and personnel adapted from Tidal.

Musicians
 Jason Michael Goldberg – composer, songwriter
 Brian Stewart – production, composer, songwriter
 Giovanni Gardner – production, composer, songwriter
 Kentrell DeSean Gaulden – lead artist, songwriter, composer

Technical
 Cheese – mastering engineer
 Cheese – mixing engineer
 Cheese – recording engineer

Charts

References

2022 songs
YoungBoy Never Broke Again songs
Songs written by YoungBoy Never Broke Again